The Diocese of the Northeast and Mid-Atlantic, with the Convocation of Eastern Canada, formerly known as the New York and Philadelphia Synod, is a founding jurisdiction of the Reformed Episcopal Church in 1873 and, more recently, a founding diocese of the Anglican Church in North America in 2009.  It comprises 27 parishes, 26 of them in five American states Maryland, Massachusetts, Pennsylvania, New Jersey and New York and one in the Canadian province of Ontario.  The headquarters are located in Blue Bell, Pennsylvania.  The current bishop is R. Charles Gillin.

The Reformed Episcopal Church of the United States, founded in 1873, was originally organized into synods.  The New York and Philadelphia Synod, one of the REC's founding synods, was renamed the Diocese of the Northeast and Mid-Atlantic when the nomenclature was changed in 1984.

As part of the Reformed Episcopal Church, the Diocese of the Northeast and Mid-Atlantic took part in the Anglican realignment movement in the United States, being one of the founding dioceses of the Anglican Church in North America, in 2009.

The diocese is home for the Reformed Episcopal Seminary, in Blue Bell, Pennsylvania.

List of bishops ordinary

Bishops from 1873 to 1984 were bishops of the New York and Philadelphia synod; bishops from 1984 to the present were bishops of the Diocese of the Northeast and Mid-Atlantic.
 George D. Cummins (1873–1876)
 William R. Nicholson (1876–1901)
 James Allen Latané (1901–1902)
 William T. Sabine (1902–1913)
 Robert Livingston Rudolph (1913–1930)
 Robert Westly Peach (1930–1936)
 William Culbertson III (1937–1942)
 Howard D. Higgins (1942–1972)
 Theophilus J. Herter (1972–1984)
 Leonard W. Riches (1984–2008)
 David L. Hicks (2008–2019)
 R. Charles Gillin (2019–present)

References

External links
Diocese of the Northeast and Mid-Atlantic official website

Dioceses of the Anglican Church in North America
Anglican dioceses established in the 20th century
Christian organizations established in 1984
1984 establishments in the United States
Dioceses of the Reformed Episcopal Church